Thomas Hare may refer to:

Thomas Hare (political scientist) (1806–1891), proponent of electoral reform
Thomas Hare (MP) (1686–1760), Member of Parliament for Truro
Tom Hare (born 1952), professor and Japanologist
Tom Hare (veterinary pathologist) (1895–1959), British veterinary pathologist
Thomas Truxtun Hare (1878–1956), American track and field athlete
Richard Hare (bishop) (Thomas Richard Hare, 1922–2010), bishop of Pontefract
Sir Thomas Hare, 2nd Baronet (1658–1693), Member of Parliament for Norfolk, 1685–1689
Sir Thomas Leigh Hare, 1st Baronet (1859–1941), British Member of Parliament for South West Norfolk, 1892–1906
Sir Thomas Hare, 5th Baronet (1930–1993), cricketer